Tarrós is a village in Baranya county, Hungary. Its population at the 2011 census was 129.

Local government 
The village is governed by a mayor with a four-person council. The local government of the village operates a joint council office with the nearby localities of Ág, Gerényes, Kisvaszar, Tékes and Vásárosdombó. The seat of the joint council is in Vásárosdombó.

Mayors since 1990

External links 

 OpenStreetMap

References 

Populated places in Baranya County